Chongqing Technology and Business University is a public university in Nan'an District, Chongqing, China. It was formed by the merger of the predecessor Chongqing Business School and Yuzhou University in 2002.

History

The university started with the name of Chongqing Institute of Electromechanical Technology (重庆机电工艺学校) in 1952 as one of the first public universities established by the Chongqing local government. It became Yuzhou University (渝州大学) in 1978.

In 2002, Yuzhou University merged with Chongqing Business College and switched its name to Chongqing Technology and Business University.

Departments

References

External links
Chongqing Technology and Business University website 
Chongqing Technology and Business University website

Universities and colleges in Chongqing
Business schools in China
Technical universities and colleges in China
Nan'an District
1952 establishments in China
Educational institutions established in 1952